Hernandia hammelii is a species of plant in the Hernandiaceae family. It is endemic to Panama.  It is threatened by habitat loss.

References

Hernandiaceae
Data deficient plants
Endemic flora of Panama
Taxonomy articles created by Polbot